People’s Energy was an energy supplier based in Shawfair, Scotland.

History
Co-founders David Pike and Karin Sode launched a crowdfunding campaign in 2017 to launch the company with the promise of returning 75% of profits back to customers. On 31 July 2017, the company successfully raised £487,815 from 2,059 supporters in 199 days. The company received their Ofgem licence and launched in August 2017.

People’s Energy Community Interest Company is the parent company of The People’s Energy Company Limited, which owns People’s Energy (Supply) Limited.

On the 14 September 2021, it was announced that the company would cease trading with immediate effect. Several other companies, including PFP Energy, MoneyPlus Energy and Utility point, also fell within the same fortnight on account of skyrocketing power prices.

Customer numbers
People’s Energy supplied around 350,000 customers.

Energy mix
People's Energy offered 100% renewable electricity.

References

Companies based in Midlothian
Electric power companies of Scotland
Energy companies established in 2017
Energy companies disestablished in 2021
Renewable energy companies of the United Kingdom
2017 establishments in Scotland
2021 disestablishments in Scotland